Mill River may refer to:

Rivers in the United States
Mill River (Connecticut), in New Haven County
Mill River (Fairfield, Connecticut)
Mill River, in Stamford, Connecticut, part of the Rippowam River
Mill River (Harrington Bay), in Washington County, Maine
Mill River (Saint George River tributary), in Thomaston, Maine
Mill River (Massachusetts–Rhode Island)
Mill River (Northampton, Massachusetts)
Mill River (Springfield, Massachusetts)
Mill River (Taunton River tributary), in Taunton, Massachusetts
Mill River (Otter Creek tributary), in Rutland County, Vermont

Other uses
Mill River, New Haven, Connecticut, U.S.
Mill River, Massachusetts, U.S.
Mill River Historic District
Mill River East, Prince Edward Island, Canada
Mill River Union High School, in Clarendon, Vermont, U.S.

See also

Mill (disambiguation) 
Mill Creek (disambiguation) 
Mills River